The event was being held for the first time since 1997.

Jaroslav Levinský and Michal Mertiňák won the title, defeating Davide Sanguinetti and Andreas Seppi 7–6(9–7), 6–1 in the final.

Seeds

Draw

Draw

External links
Draw

2006 in Croatian tennis
Zagreb Indoors
2006 ATP Tour
2006 PBZ Zagreb Indoors